Catherine Michaela of Spain (10 October 1567 – 6 November 1597) was Duchess of Savoy by marriage to Charles Emmanuel I, Duke of Savoy. She ruled the Duchy several times as regent in Charles Emmanuel's absence, notably during his campaign in 1594. She was the younger surviving daughter of Philip II of Spain and Elisabeth of Valois.

Early life
Catherine Michaela was the daughter of Philip II, ruler of the vast Spanish Empire, and his third wife, the French princess Elisabeth of Valois. 

She was described as beautiful, intelligent, arrogant and well aware of her high social status. Though her father did not attend her christening and was not as rejoiced at the birth of a daughter as he had been with her elder sister, Isabella Clara Eugenia, she had a good relationship with him. Philip and Catherine Michaela  exchanged letters throughout her life. 

She had a close relationship with her sister. They were raised together under the care of Margarita de Cardona, the lady-in-waiting of their stepmother, Anna of Austria, and some of her mother's own ladies such as Claude de Vineulx. Her grandmother Catherine de' Medici was given regular reports of Catherine and her sister, and she had their portraits sent and put in her book of hours. She was probably named after Catherine de Medici.

Duchess of Savoy
Charles Emmanuel I, Duke of Savoy suggested that he should marry Catalina Micaela as a way of gaining Spanish support for his plans to expand Savoy on the coast of the then weakened France. The wedding took place in Zaragoza on 11 March 1585, and the couple made their entrance to Turin in Savoy on 10 August 1585.

Catherine Michaela was initially unpopular because of her arrogance and attempts to introduce Spanish pomp, ceremony and way of dress to the court in Turin. However, she soon gained respect because of her political and diplomatic skill, which she used to defend the autonomy of Savoy against Spain. She refused the Spanish offer to install a Spanish garrison in Turin from Milan with the excuse of giving her a life guard. 

She is reported to have had great influence on Charles Emmanuel I and to have reformed him for the better. She also served as regent several times during the absence of the duke on military campaigns, such as during the Lyon campaign in 1594. Catherine Michaela also benefited cultural life in Savoy, founded many new buildings including an art gallery. Due to her influence, her sons were educated in Spain.

Catherine Michaela died in childbirth near the end of 1597. She had been constantly pregnant during much of her twelve years of marriage, giving birth almost once per year, and she had miscarried earlier that year. Her death is said to have hastened the death of her old father, who died the following year.

Children

In 1585, Catherine Michaela married Charles Emmanuel I, Duke of Savoy. This marriage produced ten children in just eleven years:

Philip Emmanuel, Prince of Piedmont (1586–1605)
 Victor Amadeus (1587–1637)
 Emanuel Filibert of Savoy, (1588–1624), Spanish Viceroy of Sicily,  (1622–24).
 Margaret (1589–1655), married Francesco IV Gonzaga of Mantua
 Isabella (1591–1626), married Alfonso III d'Este, duke of Modena
 Maurice, a cardinal (1593–1657)
Maria Apollonia, a nun in Rome (1594–1656)
Francesca Caterina, a nun in Biella (1595–1640)
Thomas Francis, Prince of Carignano (1596–1656), Founder of the House of Savoy-Carignano and ancestor of the erstwhile ruling Family of Italy
Giovanna  (born and died 1597)

Ancestry

References

Sources

|-

1567 births
1597 deaths
16th-century Spanish people
16th-century Spanish women
16th-century House of Habsburg
Nobility from Madrid
Austrian princesses
Spanish infantas
Duchesses of Savoy
Deaths in childbirth
Portuguese infantas
16th-century women rulers
Children of Philip II of Spain
Spanish people of Austrian descent
Castilian infantas
Aragonese infantas
Sofonisba Anguissola
Daughters of kings